Angel Robinson Garcia (May 9, 1937 – June 1, 2000) was a Cuban professional boxer, who was the Latin American Super-Featherweight champion. He also fought for the Cuban national Lightweight title, but lost.

Robinson Garcia was known for his large number of professional fights-he fought 237 times-the quality of opponents he faced and number of countries he visited. Robinson Garcia competed against 42 boxers who were world ranked, 16 world champions, 6 International Boxing Hall of Fame members, in  19 countries and 4 continents. Many of the places he fought at, like France, the United States and Italy, were visited very often by Robinson Garcia.

Notable professional fights
Angel Robinson Garcia started his professional boxing career on July 23, 1955, beating Roberto Garcia by first-round knockout at Havana. He was undefeated for his first four fights, all wins by knockout. On October 28 of 1955, he faced Reinaldo Marquez at Santa Clara, losing for the first time, on a four-round decision. He avenged that loss with a six-round decision win over Marquez on April 5, 1956, also at Santa Clara.

Having amassed a record of 28–2 with 10 knockouts, Robinson Garcia challenged Isidro Martinez, 19-4-1, for the Latin American Super-Featherweight (Junior-Lightweight) title. Robinson Garcia defeated Martinez after dropping him in round eight, with a ninth-round technical knockout, on February 26, 1958, at Havana. Two weeks after, Robinson Garcia held his first fight abroad, and first in the United States, when he faced Bobby Rogers on March 11 at the Auditorium, Miami Beach, losing that encounter by a ten-round decision.

On June 28, 1958, he faced fellow Cuban, world-ranked "Puppy" Garcia, who was 33-8-4 before their fight, at Havana, losing a 10-round unanimous decision.

On January 20, 1959, Robinson Garcia fought Frankie Ryff, again losing by unanimous decision in 10 rounds. On March 14 of that year, he met Doug Vaillant in Havana, losing a ten-round unanimous decision before then taking on Mexico's Alfredo Urbina on May 16, beating the Mexican by a ten-round unanimous decision. He then met Carlos Hernandez, the future Venezuela's first world champion boxer in history, and fought Hernandez to a ten-round draw (tie) August 15, 1959. Robinson Garcia faced Vicente Rivas and Jiro Sawada before 1959 ended, losing to Rivas but beating Sawada, both by ten-round decisions in Venezuela.

During 1960, Robinson Garcia squared off with Jose Stable twice, Mantequilla Napoles, Hernandez and Vaillant in rematches. He split his two bouts with Stable, winning a split decision and then losing a unanimous one, lost a ten-round decision to Napoles, drew with Vaillant and lost twice to Hernandez. He also fought six other fights against lesser-known rivals, going 5–1 with 3 knockout wins on those.

Robinson Garcia had a third meeting with Doug Vaillant, this time with the Cuban national title on the line. On February 1, at Havana, they had a close 12 round bout, Vaillant prevailing by a split decision. On March, Robinson Garcia made his first trip as a professional boxer to Mexico, being defeated there on March 25 by Urbina on a rematch by ninth-round technical knockout and then on April 22 by Kid Anahuac by third round disqualification. Robinson Garcia lived in Mexico for one month, before returning to Cuba to face Jose Napoles a second time: on June 3, 1961, he again went ten rounds with the future world Welterweight champion and International Boxing Hall of Fame member, but once again dropped a points decision.

One month later, on July 7, Robinson Garcia boxed 16-1-2 Pastor Marrero at Havana and won by decision in ten rounds. Fidel Castro soon abolished professional boxing in Cuba, however, and this would be Robinson Garcia's last presentation as a boxer in his home country.

Robinson Garcia flew to Jamaica to fight Bunny Grant at the National Stadium in Kingston, on August 30, losing that fight by a close but unanimous ten-round decision, judges Tony Bridge scoring against him 99–96, Gilbert Aarons also against him 97-96 and Seaside Johnson deeming him loser by a wider score of 99–93.

Robinson Garcia returned to the winning column six weeks later, defeating Hilton Smith by a 10-round unanimous decision at Miami. He temporarily moved to Miami, being trained by Angelo Dundee at the 5th Street Gym there.

He then settled in France, fighting his next seven bouts there, going undefeated during that period, with four knockout wins. On September 11, 1962, Robinson Garcia faced world ranked Valerio Nunez, 36-1 before their bout, at Palazzetto dello Sport, Rome, Italy, and upset Nunez by pulling a seventh-round disqualification win.

After 2 more victories and 1 draw, Robinson Garcia faced the well-known French fighter, Jean Josselin, until then undefeated in 17 outings, on December 3, at the Palais des Sports, Paris, France, losing to Josselin by a ten rounds unanimous decision.

Robinson Garcia began 1963 by fighting against another world champion and future International Boxing Hall of Fame member, Eddie Perkins, at the Palais de Sports, losing a ten-round unanimous decision. He slowed his schedule somewhat during this year, fighting only 4 more times, during which he went undefeated with 2 wins and two draws, one win by knockout.

1964 was another typical career year for Robinson Garcia, as he fought eight times, including: a fight on March 9 against another world champion and future International Boxing Hall of Famer, Ismael Laguna, where he actually dropped Laguna in the first round before losing on points in ten rounds at Paris; an April 13 upset of 16-1 Rey Adigun, beaten by a fifth-round technical knockout; and a June 5 upset of Rafiu King, who was beaten by ten rounds decision at the Ivory Coast.

In 1965, Robinson Garcia returned to the ring 13 times, going 9–4 with 2 knockouts against the likes of Joe Tetteh, beaten by a ten-round decision at Tunis, Tunisia  January 30, and Olli Maki, against whom he lost by ten-round decision in Tampere, Finland, on February 21. 1965 also saw Robinson Garcia re-settle, moving to Spain, where he held his next 11 bouts after the Maki fight.

Robinson Garcia had an active 1966, with 20 fights that year, winning 12, losing 3 and drawing 5, with 6 knockouts. On February 22, he met Maurice Cullen at the Royal Albert Hall, London, England, losing by ten-round decision. On April 10, he knocked out Kid Tano, 45-5-6, in six rounds at the Canary Islands and then, only 11 days later, he held Italy's Carmelo Bossi, a future world champion, to a ten-round draw at Barcelona.

1967 saw an April 28 fight against Bruno Arcari at Genoa, Italy, which Robinson Garcia lost by ten-round decision; a rematch with Bossi on July 14 in Rome that resulted in Bossi defeating Robinson Garcia by fifth-round knockout; a rematch with Eddie Perkins in Milan on December 5 that was won by Perkins by ten-round decision; and seven more bouts in which Robinson Garcia won 5, lost 2 and scored 4 knockout wins.

In 1968, Robinson Garcia fought 9 times, going 5-2-2 during the year with 3 knockouts. Among those he met on the ring that year were LC Morgan twice (March 22, ten-round draw in Rome; April 19, ninth-round knockout win in Rome), Paul Armstead three times (May 10, ten-round decision loss at Toscana; June 21, ten-round decision win at Milan; July 28, ten-round draw at San Remo) and International Boxing Hall of Fame member, future undisputed world Lightweight Champion Ken Buchanan, who beat Robinson Garcia by a ten-round decision on October 23 at London.

Robinson Garcia had a layoff of eight months between the Buchanan contest and his next one, on June 1969. The second half of that year, however, saw him fight 12 times, including a September 10 loss by ten-round decision to future WBC world Lightweight-and Spain's second-Champion Pedro Carrasco at the Basque Country and a December 30 defeat at the hands of 19-2-4 Chris Fernandez by ten-round decision also.

Robinson Garcia contested 17 bouts in 1970. These included an August 21 match with José Durán, won by Durán by ten rounds decision at Madrid and a November 20 bout with French Roger Menetrey which Menetrey won by ten-round decision at Geneva. Apart from those two fights, Robinson Garcia won 10 and lost 5 in 1970, with 1 knockout win. Between November and December 1970 alone, Robinson Garcia had 6 bouts.

Robinson Garcia went 5-6-4 in 15 bouts during 1971, with 2 knockout wins. The fights he held in 1971 included rematch wins over Joe Tetteh (by ten-round decision, February 11) and Bunny Grant (ten-round decision on April 5). Also in 1971 was a May 21 ten-round draw against former Spain and European Boxing Union Lightweight and future WBC world Junior Welterweight Champion Miguel Velazquez, who was 46-1-2 before this bout; a rematch loss to Chris Fernandez on   
July 2, by ten-round decision; and an October 1 loss to Robert Gallois, 45-5-1, by ten-round decision at Marseilles.

Perhaps the most notable of Robinson Garcia's fights was on January 15, 1972, when he faced a then 26–0, future four division world champion and International Boxing Hall of Fame member Roberto Durán at the Gimnasio Nuevo Panama-now Gimnasio Roberto Durán-at Panama City. Robinson Garcia gave Durán a relatively close fight but still lost by unanimous ten-round decision with scores of 99–93, 98-94 and 98–96, all in favor of the Panamanian. Robinson Garcia went 1-4 the rest of that year, facing, among others, Esteban De Jesus in San Juan, Puerto Rico, to whom he dropped a ten-round decision on July 8.

He split eight bouts in 1973, going 4-4 during that span, with 2 knockouts. On March 29, he boxed the future ranked challenger, Puerto Rican Sandy Torres at Tampa, Florida, and lost a ten-round decision. On July 17, he boxed future WBC world Junior Welterweight Champion Saoul Mamby at the Miami Beach auditorium and lost a ten-round decision as well.

During the first half of 1974, Robinson Garcia contested in ten fights, going 6–4 with 3 knockout wins during this span. He faced, among others, Mexican Marcos Geraldo (who'd later last ten rounds against Sugar Ray Leonard and Marvelous Marvin Hagler) on January 23 at the Silver Slipper Hotel in Las Vegas, Nevada, upsetting Geraldo by a fourth-round knockout win; then-undefeated Sugar Ray Seales on February 13 also at the Silver Slipper Hotel, losing by ten-round decision; Puerto Rican Josue Marquez (who had recently fought Antonio Cervantes for his world Junior Welterweight title) only five days after the Seales fight, losing by ten-round decision at San Juan; future Alexis Arguello world Junior Lightweight title challenger Arturo Leon, whom Robinson Garcia defeated by six-round decision at the Caesars' Tahoe in Stateline, Nevada, on April 18; Eddie Perkins again only nine days after the win against Leon-a ten-round unanimous decision loss at Tucson, Arizona; and future Angel Espada world Welterweight title challenger Johnny Gant, who obtained a ten-round decision win over Robinson Garcia on July 18 at Baltimore, Maryland. Robinson Garcia had five extra fights apart from these in 1974, going 5–0 with 3 knockouts against lesser opposition, to finish 1974 winning 11 of 15 bouts held that year.

1975 was a relatively inactive year for Robinson Garcia as he only fought five times. Nevertheless, among those five bouts was one against future Leonard world title challenger Larry Bonds, who outpointed Robinson Garcia over ten rounds at Las Vegas on February 26, future three time world champion and International Boxing Hall of Fame member, the then-only 16 years old Wilfred Benítez, who beat Robinson Garcia by ten-round decision on June 9 at the Ramon Loubriel Stadium in Bayamon, Puerto Rico-(sometimes incorrectly said to be in San Juan); and Adriano Marrero, a Dominican who would later challenge Antonio Cervantes unsuccessfully for Cervantes' WBA world Junior Welterweight title and who beat Robinson Garcia by a 10-round decision on August 5.

Of Robinson Garcia's seven 1976 bouts, six were held in the United States and one in Canada. He went 1-5-1 during that span, losing to former undisputed world Welterweight Champion Billy Backus by a ten-round unanimous decision on April 3 at Utica, New York; to Rafael Rodriguez on points in 10 on May 5 at Minneapolis, Minnesota; to former and future WBA world Welterweight title challenger Clyde Gray by ten round unanimous decision on September 2 at Halifax, Nova Scotia; and to Willie "The Worm" Monroe by a seventh-round technical knockout December 3 at Rochester, New York. He beat 24-10 Perry Abner by an upset ninth-round technical knockout on July 28 at Philadelphia, Pennsylvania.

In 1977, Robinson Garcia fought only 3 times, losing twice and winning once.

1978 proved to be Robinson Garcia's last year as an active professional boxer. He lost twice that year, including his last bout, on February 25, to contender Paul Payen, 17-1 coming in, on a ten-round decision at Hainaut, Belgium.

In 237 bouts, Robinson Garcia had a win-loss-draw record of 135 wins, 82 losses and 20 draws, his 53 knockout wins making him a member of the exclusive club of boxers with 50 or more knockout wins in professional boxing. Of his 82 defeats, only 3 were by way of knockout or technical knockout. The latter fact might have, ironically, contributed to his later, boxing related diseases as he took punches from some of boxing's best fighters of his era for prolonged periods of time.

Life away from boxing 
According to Ferdie Pacheco, Robinson Garcia once told him that he spent 6 months in an Italian jail for beating up a woman.

Cuban boxing expert Enrique Encinosa said that Robinson Garcia returned to Paris, living as a homeless man there before Fidel Castro allowed him to return to Cuba and spend his last days at the Caribbean country. Also according to Encinosa, Robinson Garcia was once married in Paris.

Professional boxing record

See also 
Peter Buckley
Buck Smith

References

1937 births
2000 deaths
Cuban male boxers
Super-featherweight boxers
Lightweight boxers
Welterweight boxers
Boxers from Havana
Sportspeople from Miami
Boxers from Paris
Homeless people
20th-century Cuban people